Cithaeron praedonius is a species of true spider in the family Cithaeronidae. It is found in North Africa, Greece, Cyprus, Turkey, India, and Malaysia, and has been introduced into Brazil, Cuba, America, and Australia.

References

Araneomorphae
Articles created by Qbugbot
Spiders described in 1872